Emma C. Chappell (born Emma Carolyn Bayton; February 18, 1941 – March 16, 2021) was the founder and CEO of the United Bank of Philadelphia. She was the first African-American woman to form a commercial bank in the United States. She was also the first female vice president of a major bank in the state of Pennsylvania.

Early life 
Emma Carolyn Bayton was born in Philadelphia, Pennsylvania, on February 18, 1941. When she was 14, her mother died, so she was raised by her father, George Bayton. She attended West Philadelphia High School and was a member of Zion Baptist Church. Her pastor, Rev. Leon H. Sullivan, a leader in the Philadelphia civil rights movement, noticed her superior mathematical skills after giving her an aptitude test. With his help, she became a clerk-photographer at Continental Bank in 1959, where she made photostats of deposited checks for bank records.

Career 
The bank required that Chappell get a college degree before she could be promoted, so she attended class at Temple University at night for five years. In 1967, Chappell was asked to enter an executive training program, allowing her to work in every department the bank had to offer. She was promoted to assistant treasurer in 1971 after completing the program. By 1977, she had become Continental Bank's first African American vice president. She was the first female vice president of a major bank in the history of Pennsylvania. Chappell was in charge of the Community Business Loan and Development Department for loans to minority-owned and women-owned small businesses. She prided herself on using her position to assist in the development of Philadelphia's black community. She granted more than $30 million in loans to black enterprises. She also organized the Model Cities Business and Commercial Project, now called the Philadelphia Commercial Development Project, which revitalized commerce in the inner city. Chappell returned to school in 1982 and earned her master's degree from the ABA Stonier Graduate School of Banking at Rutgers University.

She took a leave of absence from the bank in 1984 to serve as national treasurer for Jesse Jackson's presidential campaign.

In 1987, a group of prominent black Philadelphians approached Chappell with the possibility of starting a black-controlled bank, and they deemed her the potential leader. They contributed $600,000, but she was stalled by the stock market crash of October 1987. In 1992, after a five-year effort to raise the 5 million dollars that was required by Pennsylvania regulators in order to capitalize a bank, Chappell founded the United Bank of Philadelphia. She raised 3 million from the black community by selling shares in $500 blocks, and raised another 3 million from big investors, resulting in 1 million more than was required. She created the United Bank of Philadelphia with intentions to foster community development by providing quality, personalized, comprehensive banking services to businesses and individuals in Philadelphia. In 1999, in recognition of the bank's exponential growth, the United Bank received the coveted Blue Chip Enterprises Award, sponsored by Mass Mutual and the United States Chamber of Commerce. Chappell, who was president, CEO, and chairman of the board, left in 2000, but the United Bank of Philadelphia remains a force in the black community. The bank celebrated their 25th anniversary in 2017.

She was one of the founders of the Delaware Valley Mortgage Plan, which was designed to help low to moderate income families buy homes.

She was the chairperson and an instrumental element in the founding of Operation PUSH, a nonprofit organization that strives to achieve financial equality for minorities. She was also a founding vice president of the National Rainbow Coalition.

She was appointed by President Clinton to serve as a member of the board of directors of the Southern African Enterprise Development Fund and the board of trustees of the Malcolm Baldrige National Quality Award.

Chappell also spearheaded a program "Passport 2000" to introduce 2000 students to savings and money management as the key to economic independence.

Death 

Emma C. Chappell died on March 16, 2021, at the age of eighty. In announcing her death, the Black Women's Leadership Council stated that Chappell "served on numerous political, civic, and non-profit campaigns to support women, minorities, and the community, and championed community banking as a means to change the trajectory for people of color by establishing the pathway for businesses owned and operated by people of color to achieve their hopes and dreams....Emma will always be remembered for her leadership, advocacy, and business acumen giving voice to social justice, racial and gender equality, and creating change. She never shrunk from a worthy battle as she continued to work using the radio airwaves, leadership as co-convener for the Women’s Leadership Council along with other civic organizations to exemplify her strong Christian faith and commitment to service."

Legacy 
Chappell is known for her strong leadership and advocacy in business, civil rights, and politics. She is also known for her support of children, minorities and women. She infamously believed in the critical importance of community banks and helping residents to achieve their hopes and dreams. Her work as a banker and community leader has granted her more than 500 awards, numerous national and international appointments, and five honorary doctoral degrees. Despite her success and many accolades, in 1998 Chappell said:

"I'm very proud of my accomplishments. It doesn't matter how many awards I've received, there's a saying: `A prophet is without honor.'"

Personal life 
Emma married Verdayne Chappell in the late 1960s, but they later divorced. They had two children: Tracey and Verdaynea.

She has expressed that her religion is Baptist.

Chappell is an honorary member of Alpha Kappa Alpha.

References 

American bankers
American women bankers
African-American bankers
Burials at West Laurel Hill Cemetery
Temple University alumni
Businesspeople from Philadelphia
1941 births
2021 deaths
20th-century African-American people
20th-century African-American women
21st-century African-American people
21st-century African-American women